Ursula Jurga is a retired East German coxswain who won one gold and two silver medals at the European championships of 1963–1966.

References

Year of birth missing (living people)
Living people
East German female rowers
Coxswains (rowing)
European Rowing Championships medalists